Gladys Smuckler Moskowitz (born 1928) is an American singer, composer and teacher. She graduated from Brooklyn College with bachelor's and master's degrees, and worked as a teacher, choir director and composer. As Gladys Young she performed in the United States and Europe as a folk singer.
 In 2003 her chamber opera The Fountain of Youth, based on Nathaniel Hawthorne's "Dr. Heidegger's Experiment," won a special commendation at the Nancy Van de Vate International Opera Competition for Women. Her music is performed internationally.

Works
Moskowitz is known for songs and chamber opera. Selected works include:
Grass, on a poem by Carl Sandburg
Chicken Little, The Sky Is Falling! A Satirical Chamber Opera, performed by Bluegrass Chamber Orchestra and Opera, Lexington, Kentucky, 2009.
More than a Voice
The Fountain of Youth, chamber opera
Three Love Songs on Poems of Sara Teasdale: "Joy"; "Advice to a Girl"; "Gifts." Premiere in New York City, 2008.
Psalm 23, for piano, oboe, cello and voice
The Masque of the Red Death, music drama in two acts after Poe
The Buried Life, for mezzo-soprano and piano
Three Songs of Passion, for piano, flute, cello, and voice; on poems by Cheryl Yuzik

References

1928 births
20th-century classical composers
21st-century American composers
21st-century classical composers
American women classical composers
American classical composers
American folk singers
American music educators
American women music educators
Living people
20th-century American women singers
20th-century American composers
21st-century American women musicians
Brooklyn College alumni
20th-century women composers
21st-century women composers
20th-century American singers